Following is a list of the chapters of the Phi Sigma Pi national honor fraternity. Active chapters are listed in bold. Inactive chapters are listed in italic.

Undergraduate chapters

Notes

References

Phi Sigma Pi
collegiate chapters